Live at the Gem is The Elders' second live album recorded at a 2005 concert at The Gem Theater in Kansas City, Missouri. The concert was filmed and released on DVD and is occasionally broadcast on PBS affiliates.

Track listing 

 "Michael's Ride" - 3:00
 "Packy Go Home" - 6:39
 "American Wake" - 4:34
 "Moore Street Girls" - 5:10
 "Love of the Century" - 6:15
 "Turnpike" - 5:00
 "Send a Prayer" - 5:35
 "Haverty Brothers" - 3:44
 "1849" - 5:46
 "Brettski's Medley" - 7:15
 "Men of Erin" - 3:59
 "Buzz's Jig" - 4:42
 "Fire In Hole" - 4:44
 "Devil's Tongue" - 6:36

The Elders (band) albums
2005 live albums